Nina C. Young (born 1984) is an American electro-acoustic composer of contemporary classical music who resides in New York City. She won the 2015 Rome Prize in musical composition, a 2021 Guggenheim Fellowship, and a 2014 Charles Ives Prize from the American Academy of Arts and Letters.

Biography 
Young was born in Nyack, New York, and raised throughout Rockland County. Her initial music education was self-taught; she began violin at age 12. In 2003 she graduated from Clarkstown High School North and then moved to Cambridge, Massachusetts, to study engineering and music at the Massachusetts Institute of Technology. In 2007 Young received two degrees from MIT: a B.S. in ocean engineering and a B.S. in music (studying primarily with Keeril Makan). She continued to work as a research assistant to Tod Machover at the MIT Media Lab. Young attended McGill University's Schulich School of Music from 2008 to 2011, receiving a M.Mus. She studied composition with Sean Ferguson, orchestration with Jean Lesage, and mixed music with Philippe Leroux. While in Montreal, Young worked as a research assistant in CIRMMT's (the Centre for Interdisciplinary Research in Music Media and Technology) Expanded Musical Practice Project and as a studio and teaching assistant at the McGill Digital Composition Studios. Young holds a doctorate in music composition from Columbia University, where she studied with Brad Garton, Georg Friedrich Haas, George Lewis, and Fred Lerdahl. At Columbia, she taught electronic music at the Computer Music Center (CMC).

Young is an assistant professor at the University of Southern California Thornton School of Music. Young has held residencies at Montalvo Arts Center, the Civitella Ranieri Foundation, and Arts Letters and Numbers. She previously taught at the Sarah and Ernest Butler School of Music at the University of Texas at Austin  and in the Arts Department at the Rensselaer Polytechnic Institute. She has also been a visiting composer at the Johns Hopkins Peabody Institute. 

In addition to her contributions as an educator and composer, Young is a promoter of contemporary music. She served as general manager of the composer collective and publisher APNM (The Association for the Promotion of New Music) from 2011-2015 and is Co-Artistic Director of the new music sinfonietta Ensemble Échappé. Young's music is published by Peermusic Classical.

Music 
Young's compositions explore the intersection of instrumental and electroacoustic music.

The Boston Globe has described Young's "John Cage-like boldness in experimentation" and "complex instrumental and electronic soundscapes".

WQXR-FM's Q2 named Young one of the "10 Imagination-Grabbing, Trailblazing Artists of 2014" with contributor Brad Balliett writing, "Nina's music is constantly surprising, but at the same time, seems predestined. Every event seems so well-placed and inevitable that one is left with the feeling that the piece could have gone only the way she has it mapped out. Echoes of Stravinsky and something spectral give way to an intensely personal voice cut through with an ear for color and balance."

Selected works

Selected awards and grants
2021 Guggenheim Fellowship in Music Composition
2015 Koussevitsky Music Foundation Commission
2015 Rome Prize, The American Academy in Rome, Italy
2015 American Composers Forum National Composition Contest, wild Up ensemble commission
2014 Aspen Music Festival Jacob Druckman Prize, orchestral commission
2014 Nouvel Ensemble Moderne's 12th International Forum, Montreal, QC
2014 Charles Ives Prize (Charles Ives Scholarship) American Academy of Arts and Letters
2014 Salvatore Martirano Memorial Composition Award (Traced Upon Cinders")
2014 Milwaukee Symphony Orchestra Composer Institute
2014 Libby Larsen Prize (Remnants) from the  International Alliance for Women in Music.
2013 American Composers Orchestra Underwood New Music Readings (Remnants) Audience Choice Award
2011 Pauline Oliveros Prize (Kolokol) from the  International Alliance for Women in Music.
2011 17th International Young Composers Meeting with the Orkest de ereprijs.
2010 BMI Foundation Student Composer Award (Kolokol'')

References

External links

21st-century American composers
American women classical composers
American classical composers
Living people
1984 births
MIT School of Engineering alumni
McGill University School of Music alumni
Columbia University School of the Arts alumni
21st-century American women musicians
Classical musicians from New York (state)
People from Nyack, New York
21st-century women composers
MIT School of Humanities, Arts, and Social Sciences alumni